Olney High School is a public high school located in Olney, Texas (USA) and classified as a 2A school by the UIL. It is part of the Olney Independent School District located in northwest Young County. In 2015, the school was rated "Met Standard" by the Texas Education Agency.

Athletics
The Olney Cubs compete in these sports - 

Baseball
Basketball
Cross Country
Football
Golf
Powerlifting
Softball
Track and Field

State Titles
Boys Golf 
1992(2A), 2000(2A), 2001(2A)
Girls Golf 
1973(B)

Band
Marching Band State Champions 
1988(2A)

Theater
One Act Play 
1969(2A)

Alumni

 Riley Greer, J.P. Morgan Executive 
 James Vick, professional Mixed Martial Artist, current UFC Lightweight Contender

References

External links
Olney ISD

Public high schools in Texas
Schools in Young County, Texas